Väluste is a village in Viljandi Parish, Viljandi County, Estonia. Until the 2017 administrative reform of Estonian municipalities the village was located in Tarvastu Parish. Väluste is located on the western shore of Lake Võrtsjärv, 8.1 km (4.9 miles) south of the small borough of Mustla and 18 km (11 miles) southeast of the town of Viljandi. As of 2011, Väluste had a population of 70 residents, a decrease from 102 in the 2000 census.

Väluste is home to the Sakala Malev Estonian Defence League shooting range.

A 2.4 meter high, 16 square meter circumference granite erratic boulder is located 300 meters (984 feet) from the shore of Lake Võrtsjärv and with the surrounding 0.77 ha (83 sq ft), has been designated as a Protected Nature Monument by the Estonian Nature Conservation Act in 2007 and the International Union for Conservation of Nature.

References

Villages in Viljandi County